BURS (bottom-up rewrite system) theory tackles the problem of taking a complex expression tree or intermediate language term and finding a good translation to machine code for a particular architecture. Implementations of BURS often employ dynamic programming to solve this problem.

BURS can also be applied to the problem of designing an instruction set for an application-specific instruction set processor.

References
A. V. Aho, M. Ganapathi, and S. W. K. Tjiang. Code generation using tree matching and dynamic programming. ACM Transactions on Programming Languages and Systems, 11(4):491-516, October 1989.
Robert Giegerich and Susan L. Graham, editors. Code Generation - Concepts, Tools, Techniques. Workshops in Computing. Springer-Verlag, Berlin, Heidelberg, New York, 1992.

External links
http://www.stratego-language.org/Transform/BURG - short description of BURG including additional references to BURS and BURG

Computer languages